Jai Courtney (born 15 March 1986) is an Australian actor. He started his career with small roles in films and television series before being cast as Charlie in the action film Jack Reacher (2012). He has gone on to star in A Good Day to Die Hard (2013), I, Frankenstein (2014) and The Exception (2016).

Courtney had a recurring role as Varro in the television series Spartacus: Blood and Sand (2010). He played Eric in the science fiction action film Divergent (2014), and in 2015, he reprised the role in the sequel, Insurgent. He portrayed Kyle Reese in Terminator Genisys (2015) and DC Comics villain Captain Boomerang in Suicide Squad (2016) and The Suicide Squad (2021).

Early life
Courtney was born on 15 March 1986 in Cherrybrook, a suburb of Sydney. His father, Chris, worked for a state-owned electricity company, and his mother, Karen, was a teacher at Galston Public School, where Courtney and his older sister were students. Courtney played Rugby and participated in drama club there. He then attended Cherrybrook Technology High School and the Western Australian Academy of Performing Arts, graduating in 2008. While in college, Courtney took a ballet course and failed.

Career

Courtney's first role was in a 2005 short film titled Boys Grammar, which also starred Daniel Feuerriegel and Adam J. Yeend. In 2008, he played a role in the Australian series Packed to the Rafters, then a guest lead in the popular All Saints, the comedy feature To Hell & Bourke and several short films. In 2010, he played Varro in Spartacus: Blood and Sand for 10 episodes, before starring in Jack Reacher in 2012 with Tom Cruise and in A Good Day to Die Hard with Bruce Willis as John McClane's son, Jack. In 2014, he appeared in the films I, Frankenstein and Felony.

Courtney played Eric, one of the leaders of the faction Dauntless, in the science fiction film Divergent (2014). Later that year, he starred in Unbroken, playing Hugh "Cup" Cuppernell, and The Water Diviner, playing Lt. Col. Hughes. Courtney reprised the role of Eric in Insurgent, a sequel to Divergent, which was released in March 2015. That same year, he played one of the leads, Kyle Reese, in the science fiction action film Terminator Genisys. He worked on Insurgent and Terminator Genisys simultaneously. Terminator Genisys garnered unfavourable reviews and performed poorly at the box office. In his review, Dan Jolin of Empire described Courtney as "too buff and bland" for the role of Reese.

In March 2015, Courtney signed on to play Captain Boomerang in the 2016 DC Extended Universe film Suicide Squad. Critics lambasted the film, with The Washington Posts Michael O'Sullivan writing Courtney "barely registers" in his role. Despite this, it had a commercially successful box office run. In 2017, Courtney starred as the titular character in Melbourne Theatre Company's production of Macbeth. Reviewing the play, Cameron Woodhead of The Sydney Morning Herald highlighted his "imperfect command of the verse". Courtney played a corrupt FBI agent in the thriller film Honest Thief, which was released in October 2020. Alonso Duralde of TheWrap praised his effectiveness in the villainous role. Courtney reprised the role of Captain Boomerang in The Suicide Squad, a standalone sequel to Suicide Squad. The film was released in August 2021 to a positive critical reception. Courtney is set to star in the action thriller film Black Site as well as the thriller series The Terminal List and Kaleidoscope (under the working title Jigsaw).

Personal life 
Courtney dated Australian actress Gemma Pranita for eight years before splitting in 2013. Since 2016, Courtney has been dating Mecki Dent, an Adelaide-born PR coordinator.

Courtney has a number of tattoos including a rope, a skull, and a dog. His Suicide Squad co-star, Margot Robbie, has given Courtney two tattoos including an abbreviation (Qld) for Robbie's home state Queensland, after losing a State of Origin bet, as well as a tattoo that says "SKWAD" to memorialise his work in the film. A former smoker, he said in 2019 he had quit years prior. Courtney provided backing vocals on the Pinch Hitter song "All of a Sudden" from their debut album, When Friends Die in Accidents.

Filmography

Film

Television

Theatre

References

External links

 

1986 births
Living people
21st-century Australian male actors
Australian male film actors
Australian male television actors
Australian expatriate male actors in the United States
Male actors from Sydney
Western Australian Academy of Performing Arts alumni